The Czechoslovakian Men's Volleyball Championship was an annual competition for the men's volleyball teams in Czechoslovakia. It was held from 1924 to 1992 . The most number of titles is in the account of the Praha team "Ruda Hvezda" (since 1990 "Olympus") with 10.

The organizer of the championships was the Czechoslovak Volleyball Union (ČSVS). After the announcement of the upcoming disintegration of Czechoslovakia on January 1, 1993, ČSVS split into the Czech Volleyball Union and the Slovak Volleyball Federation. Since the 1992/93 season, independent championships of the Czech Republic and Slovakia have been held.

Winners list 

Sources

References

External links
Slovakian Volleyball Federation
Czech Volleyball Association

Czechoslovakia
1924 establishments in Czechoslovakia
Volleyball in Czechoslovakia